Gossypioides is a genus of flowering plants belonging to the family Malvaceae.

Its native range is Kenya to Southern Africa, Madagascar.

Species:

Gossypioides brevilanatum 
Gossypioides kirkii

References

Gossypieae
Malvaceae genera